Alfred Theodore Goodwin (June 29, 1923 – December 27, 2022) was an American jurist who was a United States circuit judge of the United States Court of Appeals for the Ninth Circuit and also a district judge of the United States District Court for the District of Oregon. Goodwin wrote the majority opinion for the Ninth Circuit in the famous pledge of allegiance case that was decided by the United States Supreme Court as Elk Grove Unified School District v. Newdow.   Goodwin found that the recitation of the Pledge with the words "under God" violated the Establishment Clause, but the Supreme Court reversed his ruling.  Goodwin famously wrote,  "A profession that we are a nation 'under God' is identical, for Establishment Clause purposes, to a profession that we are a nation 'under Jesus,' a nation 'under Vishnu,' a nation 'under Zeus,' or a nation 'under no god,' because none of these professions can be neutral with respect to religion."

Education and career
Born on June 29, 1923, in Bellingham, Washington, Goodwin received a Bachelor of Arts degree in 1947 from the University of Oregon and a Juris Doctor in 1951 from the University of Oregon School of Law. While in college, he served as a captain in the United States Army during World War II. Goodwin worked as an attorney for five years in Eugene, Oregon. He then served in the Oregon state courts, first on the Circuit Court (1955–1960), and then on the Supreme Court of Oregon (1960–1969). Goodwin was appointed March 18, 1960, by Oregon Governor Mark Hatfield to replace the outgoing Hall S. Lusk, who was then appointed to the United States Senate, a position Hatfield would later be elected to in 1966. Meanwhile, Goodwin was then elected to a full six-year term later in 1960 and won re-election in 1966 before resigning from the Oregon Supreme Court December 19, 1969, to take a federal judicial position.

Federal judicial service
Goodwin was nominated to a seat on the United States District Court for the District of Oregon by President Richard Nixon on September 22, 1969, to a seat vacated by Judge John Kilkenny. He was confirmed by the United States Senate on December 10, 1969, and received his commission on December 11, 1969. His service terminated on December 17, 1971, due to his elevation to the Ninth Circuit.

Goodwin was nominated to the United States Court of Appeals for the Ninth Circuit by President Nixon, on November 3, 1971, to a seat vacated by Judge John Kilkenny. He was confirmed by the Senate on November 23, 1971, received his commission on November 30, 1971, and served as Chief Judge from 1988 until he assumed senior status on January 31, 1991.

Notable cases
Goodwin wrote the majority opinion for the Ninth Circuit in the famous pledge of allegiance case that was then decided by the United States Supreme Court as Elk Grove Unified School District v. Newdow.  He also is well known for penning the opinion in White v. Samsung, a landmark right of publicity/appropriation case in California in which the host of Wheel of Fortune, Vanna White, successfully sued Samsung for airing a commercial featuring a robot dressed in her likeness and turning letters on a mock Wheel of Fortune board. See White v. Samsung Elecs. Am., 971 F.2d 1395 (9th Cir. 1992).

Personal life and death
Goodwin died on December 27, 2022, at the age of 99. At the time of his death, Goodwin was the oldest federal judge still hearing cases, and the longest-serving current federal judge.

See also

 List of United States federal judges by longevity of service

References

External links
 
 Goodwin Isn’t Fazed by Storm Over the Pledge Law.com
 University of Oregon: Awards
 Appellate Consellor Judges 
 Alfred T. Goodwin at the Oregon Encyclopedia

1923 births
2022 deaths
20th-century American judges
United States Army personnel of World War II
Judges of the United States Court of Appeals for the Ninth Circuit
Judges of the United States District Court for the District of Oregon
Oregon state court judges
Justices of the Oregon Supreme Court
Military personnel from Oregon
People from Bellingham, Washington
United States court of appeals judges appointed by Richard Nixon
United States district court judges appointed by Richard Nixon
University of Oregon School of Law alumni
United States Army colonels
United States Army Judge Advocate General's Corps
United States Army reservists